Beggars & Thieves is a band initially made up of lead vocalist Louie Merlino, guitarist Ron Mancuso, bassist Phil Soussan, and drummer Bobby Borg. Phil Soussan and Bobby Borg left after the band’s first album and after some light touring, and they are pictured on the album sleeve/liner notes and credited as having played on it.

They released a video for the song "Beggars & Thieves" from their first album.

After that album, Beggars & Thieves went through some personnel changes. Soussan left to put together a band and write for long time friend Vince Neil's first solo project and Borg left the band to form the group Left For Dead and eventually join the multi platinum group Warrant.  Mancuso, Merlino and producer Barbiero decided to carry on without them. In 1991, a new three-person lineup was formed—one that consisted of Louie Merlino on lead vocals, Mancuso on both bass and guitar and newcomer Bobby Chouinard on drums. It was also in 1991 that Beggars & Thieves left Atlantic and signed with Epic. With that new Merlino/Mancuso/Chouinard lineup plus new keyboardist Alan St. John and producer Jim Vallance, the band recorded its second album—slated to come out in 1991 or 1992 had it not been for the sudden change in musical direction that had been brought on when the grunge movement exploded commercially in 1992 and 1993, led by bands like Nirvana and Pearl Jam. Beggars & Thieves got caught in the corporate crossfire at Epic, which dropped the band without releasing that second album. Finding themselves without a record deal, Beggars & Thieves didn't record for any more major labels in the ‘90s. Almost overnight, the majors lost interest in the type of pop-metal/hard rock that Beggars & Thieves specialized in. Instead of looking for the next Axl Rose (Guns N' Roses) or the next Vince Neil (Mötley Crüe), major label A&R people were looking for the next Kurt Cobain (Nirvana) or the next Eddie Vedder (Pearl Jam). Despite the commercial decline of pop-metal and hair bands, Beggars & Thieves kept plugging away. 
In 1997, Beggars & Thieves' second album, Look What You Create—the one that Epic decided not to release--, was eventually released independently on MTM Music (although it had limited distribution). Two years later, in 1999, again on MTM Music and again working with producer Jim Vallance, the band released their third CD called The Grey Album. Drummer Sammy Mangiamele had replaced Bobby Chouinard by now, who could not finish his work on that album. 

Sadly, drummer Bobby Chouinard died on March 8, 1997. 

Beggars and Thieves is still performing as of 2011, most notably at Vamp'd Las Vegas. Singer Louie Merlino sings for the Vegas-based band Sin City Sinners when their usual singer Todd Kerns is touring with Slash. 

In December 2011 the new hardrock magnum opus We Are The Brokenhearted finally saw the light of day with a worldwide release on Frontiers Records. The hardrock album produced by R. Bernard Mann and mixed by famed engineer/songwriter Kevin Churko (Ozzy Osbourne, Five Finger Deathpunch) received fantastic reviews all over the world. The first videoclip from the album for the single "We Come Undone" excited with a guest appearance by legendary rock guitarist Jake E Lee. The second videoclip for the song "Innocence" was first introduced by AOL / Noisecreep in June. R. Bernard Mann is currently producing Jake E Lee's comeback album with Red Dragon Cartel, which also features Ron Mancuso on Bass guitar.

Musical experience of members
Louie Merlino and Ron Mancuso had previously been in the band Modern Design with Slaughter and Vince Neil bassist Dana Strum.
Now they are playing together again in the "Sin City Allstars".

Louie Merlino sang backing vocals on Fiona's Fiona and Beyond The Pale. He also sang backing vocals on Alice Cooper's album Trash and worked with a lot of other musicians. You can find a list of his work on his homepage.

In recent years he has sung with the "Sin City Allstars", a cover-band, also featuring Ron Mancuso and Brent Muscat, who was in Faster Pussycat before. 

Currently (2010–2011), Louie can be seen often singing with the Sin City Sinners, an all-star band featuring Brent Muscat, Rob Cournoyer, Todd Kerns, and Zachary Throne. When Todd Kerns is touring with Slash, Louie fills in for prolonged periods of time.

Phil Soussan has also played with Ozzy Osbourne, Jimmy Page, Ronnie James Dio, Billy Idol, Vince Neil, Richie Kotzen, Steve Lukather, Johnny Hallyday, Edgar Winter and many others.

Bobby Borg has also played for Left For Dead, Opinion, Warrant, and the Jani Lane solo project "Jabberwocky," he also authored several music business books (including The Musician's Handbook), and he is currently a professor of music industry studies at Thornton School of Music at the University of Southern California. 

The late Bobby Chouinard had previously played with Billy Squier.

Members
Louie Merlino - Vocals, Guitar, Percussion  (1989-present)
Ronnie "Ron" Mancuso - Guitar, Bass Guitar, Keyboards, Backing Vocals  (1989-present)
Phil Soussan - Bass Guitar, Guitar, Backing Vocals (1989-1991)
Bobby Borg - Drums (1989-1991)
Bobby Chouinard - Drums (1991-1997) (Died: 1997)

Discography
Beggars & Thieves (1990)
Look What You Create (1997)
The Grey Album (1999)
Stone Alone EP (2010)
We Are the Brokenhearted (2011)

See also
List of glam metal bands and artists

References

External links
Official band webpage
Reverbnation
Notes of Co-Songwriter and producer Jim Vallance
Louie Merlino's Interview on Maximum Threshold Radio

1989 establishments in New York City
Glam metal musical groups from New York (state)
Hard rock musical groups from New York (state)
Musical groups established in 1989
Musical groups from New York City
Frontiers Records artists
Atlantic Records artists
Epic Records artists